The Fiat 524 is a car which was produced by Italian automotive manufacturer Fiat between 1931 and 1934. 
The 524 was a bigger and more luxurious version of the Fiat 522 model.
10,135 cars were produced in total.

A Polish version called the Fiat-Polski 524 was also built in Warsaw.

Model types
Cabriolet, 4 doors, 4 seats
Limousine, 4 doors, 4 seats
Saloon, 4 doors, 4 seats

524
Cars introduced in 1931
Science and technology in Poland